Miscellaneous centre (Divers centre, DVC) in France refers to centrist candidates who are not members of any large party. It is a nuance and de facto a political label created by the French Ministry of the Interior in 2020.

Affiliated MPs in the 15th legislature sit as Non-Attached Members.

History 
From 2001 to 2008, the declaration of political nuance "without label" is no longer authorized by the Ministry of the Interior and the nuance "various centers" does not exist, the candidates and lists presenting themselves as "without label" or "Centrists" were then classified as "various right" (DVD) or "various left" (DVG) according to the political tendency declared or supposed closest. In 2008, the introduction of the LDIV nuance for the “miscellaneous” list made it possible to counterbalance this device.

Controversy 
Several opposition parties accuse the government of having created this new political nuance to "manipulate" the municipal elections of March 2020 by promoting the results of La République en Marche and its allies.

Membership 
Since the dissolution of Ecology Democracy Solidarity in October 2020.

 Paula Forteza
 Olivier Gaillard
 Albane Gaillot
 Cédric Villani
 Matthieu Orphelin
Since 2022:

 Christine Decodts

See also 
 , another related de facto political label also used in 2020 to refer to a local alliance of candidates belonging to several centrist political parties
Miscellaneous right
Miscellaneous left

References 

Political parties of the French Fifth Republic
Centrism in Europe
Independent politicians in France